Bendigo South East College (BSE) is an Australian secondary school in Bendigo, Victoria, for year 7-10 students.

History
BSE occupies a building originally known as the Bendigo Girls' School. That school had been founded in 1916, originally located in the Quarry Hill suburb of Bendigo but moving to the Flora Hill suburb in 1959.

In 1974, the school became co-educational, under the name Flora Hill High School, which was later renamed to Flora Hill Secondary College.

In 2008/2009 Flora Hill Secondary College and Golden Square Secondary College combined and were renamed Bendigo South East Secondary College.

, the new buildings have been completed. The last of the classrooms from 1959 was demolished in August 2011. Although the main construction project has been finalised, the hall is still under renovation for the new athlete development program which was established in 2014.

The Athlete Development Program at BSE is a complete sports education and training program aimed to assist students in the pursuit of sporting and academic excellence. The program runs for the entire school year. Students are eligible for selection every year they attend the school.

Another specialist program introduced in 2016 is the Academy of Creative Arts (ACA). The Bendigo South East College Academy of Creative Arts (ACA) nurtures the creativity, artistry and scholarship of students. Students can apply to be in one of the five fields: drama, vocals, visual arts, music or dance.

Golden Square Secondary College was closed at the end of 2008 and was demolished in late 2009; the site is currently vacant.

Staff
As of January 2019, Glen Donald is principal of the school, replacing Ernie Fleming.

See also
Bendigo Senior Secondary College
Crusoe Secondary College
List of schools in Victoria

References

Public high schools in Victoria (Australia)
1916 establishments in Australia
Education in Bendigo
Bendigo